Embal is a village in Arimalam block of Pudukkottai district, Tamil Nadu, India.

Demographics 

As per the 2001 census, Embal had a total population of 2414 with 1195 males and 1219 females. Out of the total population 1531 people were literate.

References

Villages in Pudukkottai district